David Ian Hewlett (born 18 April 1968) is a British-born Canadian actor, writer, and director known for his role as Dr. Rodney McKay in the Stargate science-fiction franchise. He first gained fame for his roles as Grant Jansky in the Canadian TV series Traders (1996—2000) and as David Worth in the Canadian psychological horror film Cube (1997). He had earlier appeared in the horror film Pin (1988) and the science-fiction film Scanners II: The New Order (1991).

More recently, Hewlett had a prominent supporting role in Rise of the Planet of the Apes (2011), portraying bad-tempered airplane pilot Douglas Hunsiker opposite John Lithgow and Andy Serkis. Hewlett played the character Fleming in the multi-Academy Award winning film The Shape of Water (2017).

Early life 
Hewlett was born in Redhill, England, and moved with his family to Canada at the age of four. Hewlett received his first computer in his mid-teens and became a self-described "computer nerd". While attending high school in Toronto, he launched his acting career, starring in student films by Vincenzo Natali. He dropped out of high school in his senior year to pursue careers in acting and computing, at the beginning of his acting career in 1984 at the age of sixteen.

Before his acting career took off, Hewlett ran Darkyl Media, a web site design firm, and also founded Fusefilm.com, a now defunct internet community for filmmakers.

Career 
Hewlett has appeared in many low-budget horror films, such as The Darkside and the minor cult favourites Scanners II: The New Order and Pin. He also guest starred in several television series. In 1996, he landed one of his better-known roles, as Grant Jansky on Traders. In 1997, Hewlett worked with Natali again, starring in his critically acclaimed thriller Cube as Worth the architect. The low budget Canadian film was commercially successful.

Hewlett, an avid science fiction fan, has been quoted saying that Doctor Who, a sci-fi program made in his native Britain, is what first sparked his love for the genre, and that he made science fiction with his friends when he was younger in Britain, on his 8 millimetre camera. Hewlett had his early dreams of working in science fiction made into a reality, when he first had a four-episode guest role on the Canadian/American sci-fi series Stargate SG-1, as the Stargate expert Rodney McKay, which eventually grew into his starring role on Stargate Atlantis.

In 2007, Hewlett appeared as a guest star in the first episode of the TV series Sanctuary, a show produced by and starring Stargate actress Amanda Tapping. He played Larry Tolson, a patient suffering from a form of psychosis who is shot and wounded before being taken into police custody as a murder suspect.

In 2006, he wrote and directed A Dog's Breakfast starring himself, his sister Kate Hewlett, his dog Mars, and his Stargate Atlantis costars Paul McGillion, Christopher Judge and Rachel Luttrell. In July 2006, Hewlett created a YouTube channel named Fanatical.

In 2014, Hewlett directed the supernatural horror-science fiction film Debug with Jason Momoa, who starred alongside Hewlett in Stargate Atlantis. Jeananne Goossen and Adrian Holmes played the lead roles in the film.

In 2015, Hewlett appeared in the Syfy TV series Dark Matter, which is based on the comic book of the same name. He played a recurring role as Tabor Calchek, a merchant who also serves as the team's handler. Hewlett continues his interest in filmmaking.

In 2017, he made "HEWLOGRAM," a sci-fi comedy short showcasing the filmmaking and special effects tools of Red Giant.

Personal life 
Hewlett married actress Soo Garay in 2000; they divorced in 2004. He married Jane Loughman in 2008. They have one child. Hewlett's younger sister is actress Kate Hewlett. She has appeared on Stargate Atlantis as Rodney McKay's sister, Jeannie Miller, multiple times in the series. When he's not filming, Hewlett volunteers as a parent sponsor of a school PC/Tech club for kids interested in 3D printing, programming and repurposing tech equipment.

Filmography

Film

Television

References

External links 

 
 
 

1968 births
Canadian male film actors
Canadian male television actors
Canadian male voice actors
English male voice actors
English male film actors
English emigrants to Canada
English male television actors
Living people
People from Redhill, Surrey
Male actors from Toronto
English expatriates in Canada
Canadian emigrants to the United States
American male television actors
20th-century Canadian male actors
21st-century Canadian male actors
20th-century English male actors
21st-century English male actors
Male actors from Surrey